The 1889 San Diego mayoral election was held on April 2, 1889 to elect the mayor for San Diego. Douglas Gunn was elected Mayor with a majority of the votes.

Candidates
Douglas Gunn, businessman and former newspaper proprietor
John R. Berry, newspaper proprietor

Campaign
In November 1888, incumbent Mayor William Jefferson Hunsaker resigned from office prior to the completion of his term in office. Council president Martin D. Hamilton served as acting mayor until the 1889 election could be held.

The 1889 campaign featured two Republican newspaper proprietors. Douglas Gunn ran on the non-partisan Citizens' ticket. John R. Berry ran on the Straight Republican ticket.

On April 2, 1889, Gunn was elected mayor with 58.4 percent of the vote to Berry's 41.6 percent.

Election results

References

1889
1889 United States mayoral elections
1889 California elections
19th century in San Diego
April 1889 events